The United States Conference of Catholic Bishops (USCCB) is the episcopal conference of the Catholic Church in the United States. Founded in 1966 as the joint National Conference of Catholic Bishops (NCCB) and United States Catholic Conference (USCC), it is composed of all active and retired members of the Catholic hierarchy (i.e., diocesan, coadjutor, and auxiliary bishops and the ordinary of the Personal Ordinariate of the Chair of Saint Peter) in the United States and the territory of the U.S. Virgin Islands. 

In the Commonwealth of Puerto Rico, the bishops in the six dioceses form their own episcopal conference, the Puerto Rican Episcopal Conference. The bishops in U.S. insular areas in the Pacific Ocean the Commonwealth of the Northern Mariana Islands, the territory of American Samoa, and the territory of Guam are members of the Episcopal Conference of the Pacific.

The USCCB adopted its current name in July 2001.  The organization is a registered corporation based in Washington, D.C. As with all bishops' conferences, certain decisions and acts of the USCCB must receive the recognitio, or approval, of the Roman dicasteries, which are subject to the immediate and absolute authority of the Pope.

, the president is Timothy Broglio, Archbishop for the Military Services, USA. The vice president is William E. Lori, Archbishop of Baltimore.

History
The United States Conference of Catholic Bishops took its present form in 2001 from the consolidation of the National Conference of Catholic Bishops and the United States Catholic Conference.  The USCCB traces its origins to the National Catholic War Council, which was founded in 1917.

National Catholic War Council

The first national organization of Catholic bishops in the United States was founded in 1917 as the National Catholic War Council (NCWC), formed to enable U.S. Catholics to contribute funds for the spiritual care of Catholic servicemen during World War I.

National Catholic Welfare Council

In 1919 Pope Benedict XV urged the college of bishops around the world to assist him in promoting the labor reforms first articulated by Pope Leo XIII in Rerum novarum. In response, the U.S. Catholic episcopate organized the National Catholic Welfare Council in 1919. They also created the first Administrative Committee of seven members to manage daily affairs between plenary meetings, with archbishop Edward Joseph Hanna of San Francisco as the first chairman. Headquarters were established in Washington, D.C.

After a threatened suppression of the National Catholic Welfare Council due to concerns that it over-centralized power away from the individual bishops, the administrative board decided to rename the organization to be the National Catholic Welfare Conference, with the purpose of advocating reforms in education, immigration, and social action.

Leadership of José Gómez 
During the 2020 George Floyd protests, USCCB president Archbishop José Horacio Gómez issued a statement citing Martin Luther King Jr.'s words that "riots are the language of the unheard".

After some conservative bishops were concerned after Gómez congratulated Joe Biden for his election as US president, Gómez announced that he would form a working group to address the "confusion" that could be caused by Catholic politicians who support policies that are against church teaching. On January 20, 2021, the date of President Joe Biden's inauguration, when he became the second Roman Catholic U.S. president, the USCCB sent him a letter authored by President Gómez, which was described as "stinging" by America. While congratulating Biden on his election and stating the Bishop was "praying that God grant him wisdom and courage to lead this great nation and that God help him to meet the tests of these times," the letter also expressed concern that his policies "would advance moral evils and threaten human life and dignity, most seriously in the areas of abortion, contraception, marriage, and gender. Of deep concern is the liberty of the Church and the freedom of believers to live according to their consciences." 

The letter was contested by several bishops, including Cardinal Blase J. Cupich, the archbishop of Chicago, who said the message was drafted without consultation of the USCCB's administrative committee; and described it as an "institutional failure" that the bishops did not harmonize their message prior to its release. In what America called a "rare rebuke," Cupich released two statements, one of which said “Today, the United States Conference of Catholic Bishops issued an ill-considered statement on the day of President Biden’s inauguration. Aside from the fact that there is seemingly no precedent for doing so, the statement, critical of President Biden, came as a surprise to many bishops, who received it just hours before it was released.”

By April 2021, the working group that was announced by Gómez proposed the drafting of a new document addressing the issue of Communion. On March 30, 2021, Bishop Gómez wrote to the Congregation for the Doctrine of the Faith (CDF), informing the congregation of the USCCB's plans to draft a document regarding Catholic politicians' worthiness to receive Communion. Cardinal Luis Ladaria, prefect of the CDF, replied on 7 May, cautioning the USCCB to preserve unity in discussing anti-abortion issues and not to consider that abortion and euthanasia constitute the only grave issues of Catholic moral teaching. Ladaria further said that any new provision of the USCCB is required to respect the rights of individual Ordinaries in their diocese and the prerogatives of the Holy See.

Regions

The dioceses of the United States are grouped into fifteen regions.  Fourteen of the regions (numbered I through XIV) are geographically based, for the Latin Catholic dioceses and the non-territorial Personal Ordinariate of the Chair of St. Peter (part of Region X).  The Eastern Catholic eparchies (dioceses) constitute Region XV.

Initiatives

National Right to Life Committee (1968–1973)

The National Conference of Catholic Bishops had appointed Bishop James T. McHugh during April 1967 to lead the early formation of what was later to become the National Right to Life Committee. The NRLC was itself formed in 1968 under the auspices of the National Conference of Catholic Bishops to coordinate information and strategy between developing local and state Catholic anti-abortion groups and is the oldest and the largest national organization against legal abortion in the United States with NRLC affiliates in all 50 states and over 3,000 local chapters nationwide. These NRLC affiliate groups were forming in response to efforts to change abortion laws based on model legislation proposed by the American Law Institute (ALI). New Jersey attorney Juan Ryan served as the organization's first president. NRLC held a nationwide meeting of anti-abortion leaders in Chicago in 1970 at Barat College. The following year, NRLC held its first convention at Macalestar College in St. Paul, Minnesota.

Health care 
The USCCB are issuing the "Ethical and Religious Directives for Catholic Health Care Services" that have in some cases caused doctors to refuse treatment of patients although in an emergency situation.

In March 2012, regarding the contraception mandate issued as a regulation under the Affordable Care Act, which required that employers who do not support contraception but are not religious institutions per se must cover contraception via their employer-sponsored health insurance. USCCB decided to "continue its 'vigorous opposition to this unjust and illegal mandate'".

In June and July 2012, the USCCB promoted a campaign of events called the Fortnight for Freedom to protest government activities that in their view impinged on their religious liberty.

On June 12, 2020, a committee praised President Donald Trump's administration for changing a Department of Health and Human Services ruling regarding discrimination based on gender identity, saying it "will help restore the rights of health care providers—as well as insurers and employers—who decline to perform or cover abortions or 'gender transition' procedures due to ethical or professional objections."

Immigration
The USCCB platform on immigration reform includes:

Earned legalization for immigrants who are of good moral character to adjust their status to obtain lawful permanent residence after a background check and payment of fines.
A legal path for foreign born workers to enter the U.S. for work in order to alleviate border crossing deaths. 
More visas to promote family reunification as well as a reduction in waiting times. 
Elimination of some of the penalties in the Illegal Immigration Reform and Immigrant Responsibility Act of 1996 such as the three year and ten year bans on deported illegal immigrants (depending on the length of their illegal stay in the U.S.) 
The root cause of illegal immigrations such as poverty and inequality in sending countries needs to be addressed. 
Enforcement should focus on illegal immigrants who pose risks to public safety rather than on families seeking employment.
In 2017, Bishop Joe S. Vásquez, the chairman of the USCCB Committee on Migration, issued a statement disagreeing with the first Trump travel ban, Executive Order 13769, which restricted people from several predominantly Muslim nations from entering the US and also imposed a temporary ban on Syrian refugee admissions. Later that year, the USCCB president, vice president, and committee chairmen issued a statement condemning the Trump administration's cancellation of the Deferred Action for Childhood Arrivals (DACA) program, under which nearly 800,000 young people had applied for protection from deportation.

At the 2018 biannual meeting that was held in Fort Lauderdale, Florida, USCCB president Cardinal Daniel DiNardo issued a statement criticizing the Trump administration's policies of family separation and denial of asylum to women fleeing domestic violence.

Funding
The budget for 2018 was $200 million USD. Most money is raised through national collections, government grants, and diocesan assessments.

List of past and present leaders

Presidents
The list of presidents of the USCCB, who are elected by their brother bishops, the diocese or archdiocese they led during their tenure, and their dates of service as president: 
 Cardinal John Dearden, Archbishop of Detroit (1966–1971)
 Cardinal John Krol, Archbishop of Philadelphia (1971–1974)
 Archbishop Joseph Bernardin, later Cardinal, Archbishop of Cincinnati (1974-1977)
 Archbishop John R. Quinn, Archbishop of San Francisco (1977-1980)
 Archbishop John Roach (bishop), Archbishop of Saint Paul and Minneapolis (1980-1983)
 Bishop James William Malone, Bishop of Youngstown (1983-1986)
 Archbishop John L. May, Archbishop of St. Louis (1986-1989)
 Archbishop Daniel Edward Pilarczyk, Archbishop of Cincinnati (1989-1992) 
 Cardinal William H. Keeler, Archbishop of Baltimore (1992-1995)
 Bishop Anthony Pilla, Bishop of Cleveland (1995-1998)
 Bishop Joseph Fiorenza, later Archbishop, Bishop of Galveston–Houston (1998- November 13, 2001)
 Bishop Wilton Daniel Gregory, later Cardinal, Bishop of Belleville (November 13, 2001 - November 15, 2004)
 Bishop William S. Skylstad, Bishop of Spokane (November 15, 2004 - November 13, 2007)
 Cardinal Francis George , Archbishop of Chicago (November 13, 2007 - November 16, 2010)
 Cardinal Timothy M. Dolan, Archbishop of New York (November 16, 2010 - November 14, 2013)
 Archbishop Joseph Edward Kurtz, Archbishop of Louisville (November 14, 2013 - November 15, 2016)
 Cardinal Daniel DiNardo, Archbishop of Galveston–Houston (November 15, 2016 - November 12, 2019)
 Archbishop José Horacio Gómez, Archbishop of Los Angeles (November 12, 2019 - November 15, 2022)
 Archbishop Timothy Broglio, Archbishop for the Military Services, USA (November 15, 2022 - Present)

Vice-Presidents
The list of vice-presidents of the USCCB, who are elected by their brother bishops, the diocese or archdiocese they led during their tenure, and their dates of service as vice-president: 
 Cardinal John Krol, Archbishop of Philadelphia (1966–1971)
 Coadjutor Archbishop Leo Christopher Byrne, Coadjutor Archbishop of Saint Paul and Minneapolis (1971-1974)
 Cardinal John Carberry, Archbishop of St. Louis (1974-1977)
 Archbishop John Roach (bishop), Archbishop of Saint Paul and Minneapolis (1977-1980)
 Bishop James William Malone, Bishop of Youngstown (1980-1983)
 Archbishop John L. May, Archbishop of St. Louis (1983-1986)
 Archbishop Daniel Edward Pilarczyk, Archbishop of Cincinnati (1986-1989) 
 Archbishop William H. Keeler, later Cardinal Archbishop of Baltimore (1989-1992)
 Bishop Anthony Pilla, Bishop of Cleveland (1992-1995)
 Bishop Joseph Fiorenza, later Archbishop, Bishop of Galveston–Houston (1995-1998)
 Bishop Wilton Daniel Gregory, later Cardinal, Bishop of Belleville (1998 - November 13, 2001)
 Bishop William S. Skylstad, Bishop of Spokane (November 13, 2001 - November 15, 2004)
 Cardinal Francis George , Archbishop of Chicago (November 15, 2004 - November 13, 2007)
 Bishop Gerald Frederick Kicanas, Bishop of Tucson (November 13, 2007 - November 16, 2010)
 Archbishop Joseph Edward Kurtz, Archbishop of Louisville (November 16, 2010 - November 14, 2013)
 Cardinal Daniel DiNardo, Archbishop of Galveston–Houston (November 14, 2013 - November 15, 2016)
 Archbishop José Horacio Gómez, Archbishop of Los Angeles (November 15, 2016 - November 12, 2019)
 Archbishop Allen Vigneron, Archbishop of Detroit (November 12, 2019 - November 15, 2022)
 Archbishop William E. Lori, Archbishop of Baltimore (November 15, 2022 - Present)

See also

 Catholic Church and politics in the United States
 Collegiality in the Catholic Church
 Historical list of the Catholic bishops of the United States
 History of the Catholic Church in the United States
 John Jay Report
 List of Catholic bishops of the United States
 List of Catholic dioceses in the United States
 National Federation of Priests' Councils
 Plenary Councils of Baltimore
 Pontifical North American College
 The American College of the Immaculate Conception
 Catholic News Service

References

External links
 
 GCatholic.org Bishops of United States
 USCCB Statements on Coronavirus

 
Episcopal conferences
Edgewood (Washington, D.C.)
Catholic Church in the United States
Catholic Church in Washington, D.C.
Non-profit organizations based in Washington, D.C.
Christian organizations established in 1966
Catholic organizations established in the 20th century
1966 establishments in Washington, D.C.